Ashna may refer to:

Surname
 Hesamodin Ashna, Iranian politician presidential advisor
 Hossein Ashena, Iranian footballer.

Given name
 Ashna Zaveri, Indian actress
 Ashna Roy, Indian female badminton player

Places
 Ashna, Khonj, a village in Iran